Cajalco Canyon Creek is an ephemeral stream that flows through Cajalco Canyon in the Temescal Mountains of Riverside County, California, United States. It is a tributary to Temescal Wash, itself a tributary to the Santa Ana River.  Cajalco is thought to be a Hispanic spelling of the word for "quail" in the languages of the Luiseño and Cahuilla who lived in the area. The word Cajalco is an acronym- California Jalisco Land Company of Los Angeles

Course
Other small arroyos descended from heights to the north. It entered Temescal Wash at  after descending through the steep narrow gorge of the Cajalco Canyon in the lower reach of the creek. The original course of the creek, before 1933, can be seen on the US Dept. of the Interior's 1898 topographic map of the Elsinore Quadrangle.

Lake Mathews
In the 1930s a dam was built in Cajalco Canyon, blocking the stream as part of the Colorado River Aqueduct project that created the Cajalco Reservoir, now Lake Mathews. The lower reach below the dam still flows through what remains of Cajalco Canyon into the Temescal Wash.

References

Rivers of Riverside County, California
Tributaries of Temescal Creek
Rivers of Southern California